The 142nd Infantry Regiment is an infantry regiment in the U.S. Army National Guard.  2nd Battalion, 142nd Infantry carries the regiment's legacy as a unit of the 56th Infantry Brigade Combat Team, 36th Infantry Division.  Eleven of its members have been decorated with the United States highest award for bravery, the Medal of Honor.

Members of the 142nd arriving as reinforcements tipped the Battle for Castle Itter in favor of a combined U.S. Army/Wehrmacht defense against a Waffen SS attack, the only time German and American forces fought side-by-side in World War II.

History
The 142nd Infantry Regiment was constituted 5 May 1917 as 7th Infantry Regiment, Texas National Guard.
 Organized May‑July 1917 with headquarters federally recognized 29 July 1917. Called and drafted into Federal Service 5 August 1917.
 Consolidated with 1st Oklahoma Infantry Regiment and redesignated 142nd Infantry Regiment. Assigned to 71st Brigade, 36th Division 15 October 1917.
 Moved overseas July 1918
 Returned to U.S. June 1919. Demobilized 17 June 1919 at Camp Bowie Texas (36th Division demobilized 18 June 1919 at Camp Bowie; reorganized 2 May 1923 at San Antonio).
 Reorganized 1921‑1922 as 142nd Infantry Regiment TNG 36th Division with headquarters federally recognized 17 May 1922.
 Inducted into Federal Service 25 November 1940 at Fort Worth.
 Inactivated 15 December 1945 at Camp Patrick Henry, VA.
 Reorganized with headquarters federally recognized 26 February 1947 at Amarillo.

During the Meuse–Argonne offensive in World War I, the 142nd used Choctaw code talkers.

Coat of arms

Blazon
 Shield
Azure, a fess wavy Gules fimbriated Argent, issuant in chief the shell-torn church steeple at St. Etienne, France, of the third.
 Crest
That for the regiments and separate battalions of the Texas Army National Guard:  On a wreath of the colors Argent and Azure, a mullet Argent encircled by a garland of live oak and olive Proper.
Motto "I'll Face You"

Symbolism
 Shield
The shield is blue for Infantry.  The wavy fess symbolizes the Aisne River, where the regiment's outstanding achievements took place during World War I; it also symbolizes the Red River separating the States of Texas and Oklahoma, from which states were drawn the units composing the 142d Infantry, Texas Army National Guard – the 7th Texas and Machine Gun Company.  The church at St. Etienne, France, was in the sector where the regiment received its baptism of fire.  First Lieutenant Donald J. McLennan, D.S.C., scout officer of the 1st Battalion, 142nd Regiment Infantry, led a patrol across the Aisne River into the enemy country on 8 October 1918 and secured information of vast importance to the regiment.  As he returned, under heavy fire, to the south bank of the Aisne River with his patrol, he was the last man to cross and would not cross with his back to the enemy.  Instead, he backed across the foot-log, shaking his fist and shouting to the enemy "We’re going back, but I’ll face you."

The coat of arms was approved on 27 June 1928.

Medal of Honor recipients
The 142nd Infantry Regiment has had eleven United States Medal of Honor recipients:

 Samuel M. Sampler, Corporal, for actions near St. Etienne, France, 8 October 1918
 Harold Leo Turner, Corporal, for actions near St. Etienne, France, 8 October 1918
 James Marion Logan, Technical Sergeant, for actions near Salerno, Italy, 9 September 1943
 Arnold L. Bjorklund, First Lieutenant, Altavilla, Italy, 13 September 1943
 William J. Crawford, Private, Altavilla, Italy, 13 September 1943
 Homer L. Wise, Staff Sergeant, for actions near Magliano, Italy, 14 June 14, 1944
 Ellis R. Weicht, Sergeant, Saint-Hippolyte, 3 December 1944
 Bernard Pious Bell, Technical Sergeant, for actions near Mittelwihr, France, 18 December 1944
 Emile Deleau Jr., Sergeant, for actions near Oberhoffen, France, 1–2 February 1945
 Edward C. Dahlgren, Sergeant, for actions near Oberhoffen, France, 11 February 1945
 Silvestre S. Herrera, Private First Class, for actions near Mertzwiller, France, 15 March 1945

See also
 Choctaw code talkers
 Distinctive unit insignia (U.S. Army)

References

External links
 
 http://www.history.army.mil/html/forcestruc/lh.html 

Infantry regiments of the United States Army in World War II
142
142
Military units and formations established in 1917